Philippe Gaillot (born 28 February 1965) is a French former professional footballer who played as a defender. While at Metz, he played in the final as they won the 1995–96 Coupe de la Ligue.

References

External links

1965 births
Living people
Association football defenders
French footballers
FC Metz players
Valenciennes FC players
Ligue 1 players